Diana Mstieva (born 25 November 1994) is a Russian weightlifter and European Champion competing in the 90 kg category until 2018 and 87 kg starting in 2018 after the International Weightlifting Federation reorganized the categories.

Career
She competed at the 2019 European Weightlifting Championships in the 87 kg category.

Major results

References

External links
 

1994 births
Living people
Place of birth missing (living people)
Russian female weightlifters
Universiade silver medalists for Russia
Universiade medalists in weightlifting
European Weightlifting Championships medalists
20th-century Russian women
21st-century Russian women